Carlos Braniff (born 12 January 1928) is a Mexican former sailor who competed in the 1960, 1964, and 1968 Summer Olympics. He was born in Mexico City.

References

External links

1928 births
Possibly living people
Mexican male sailors (sport)
Olympic sailors of Mexico
Sailors at the 1960 Summer Olympics – Star
Sailors at the 1964 Summer Olympics – Star
Sailors at the 1968 Summer Olympics – 5.5 Metre
20th-century Mexican people